Günter Perl (born 23 December 1969) is a former German football referee who is based in Pullach. He refereed for Münchener SpVgg of the Bavarian Football Association.

Refereeing career
Perl was a referee of the club Münchener SpVgg, and officiated on the DFB level from 1996. Since 1998 he officiated 2. Bundesliga matches, and was appointed as a Bundesliga referee in 2005. He made his Bundesliga debut on 13 August 2005 in the match between 1. FC Kaiserslautern and MSV Duisburg.

Perl retired from officiating in 2017 because he reached the age limit for German referees, which is 47. His final Bundesliga match officiated was between Borussia Dortmund and Werder Bremen.

Personal life
Perl, a full-time wholesale and foreign trade merchant, lives in the Bavarian village of Pullach. He is married and has two sons.

References

External links
 Profile at dfb.de 
 Profile at worldfootball.net

1969 births
Living people
German football referees